Pokrovsk Raion, is a raion (district) within Donetsk Oblast in eastern Ukraine. Its administrative center is Pokrovsk.

Within Pokrovsk Raion there are: 3 urban-type settlements (Hrodivka, Novoekonomichne and Udachne), 13 silska rada (selsoviets), and 99 settlements. Also included within the raion are: 22 kolkhozy, 7 sovhozy, 5 industrial organizations, 3 hospitals, 36 schools, and 31 libraries.

An architectural monument in the raion is the Petropavlovs'ka Church (1840 – village of Krasne), Church of the Birth of the Theotokos (1799 – urban-type settlement of Novoekonomichne), and the Voznesens'ka Church (1893 – village of Novotroyits'ke). The composer Sergei Prokofiev (1891–1953) was born here.

History

In May 2014, the raion requested a referendum for its absorption into the Dnipropetrovsk Oblast, citing the instability in the Donetsk Oblast and order and stability in Dnipropetrovsk. Dnipropetrovsk governor Ihor Kolomoisky said that the oblast was willing to do so, assuming it was popular opinion in the raion.

On 21 May 2016, Verkhovna Rada adopted decision to rename Krasnoarmiisk Raion to Pokrovsk Raion and Krasnoarmiisk to Pokrovsk according to the law prohibiting names of Communist origin.

On 18 July 2020, as part of the administrative reform of Ukraine, the number of raions of Donetsk Oblast was reduced to eight, of which only five were controlled by the government, and the area of Pokrovsk Raion was significantly expanded.  The January 2020 estimate of the raion population was

Demographics
44 different nationalities live in Pokrovsk Raion. They include: Ukrainians, Russians, Belarusians, Germans, Azerbaijanis, Crimean Tatars, Moldavians, Armenians, Greeks and others. As of the 2001 Ukrainian census:

Ethnicity
 Ukrainians: 86.8%
 Russians: 11.3%
 Belarusians: 0.7%

See also
 Administrative divisions of Donetsk Oblast

References

External links

 Verkhovna Rada website – Administrative divisions of the Krasnoarmiiskyi Raion
 info.dn.ua – Information about the raion

Raions of Donetsk Oblast

1923 establishments in Ukraine